Many members of the Latter Day Saint movement believe that the Book of Mormon is historically accurate.  Most, but not all, Mormons hold the book's connection to ancient American history as an article of their faith. This view finds no acceptance outside of Mormonism in the broader scientific community. Mainstream archaeological, historical, and scientific communities do not consider the Book of Mormon an ancient record of actual historical events.

The Book of Mormon purports to give an account of two civilizations formed by families who migrated to the Americas. One group of families came from Jerusalem in 600 BC and afterward separated into two nations, known as the Nephites and the Lamanites. Another group came much earlier, when God confounded the tongues at the Tower of Babel; that group is known as the Jaredites. After thousands of years, all were destroyed except the Lamanites. Latter Day Saints believe that Lamanites are among the ancestors of the Native Americans.

Mormon apologists have proposed multiple theories to explain apparent inconsistencies with the archaeological, genetic, linguistic and other records.

Latter Day Saint views
The dominant and widely accepted view among Latter Day Saints is that the Book of Mormon is a true and accurate account of these ancient American civilizations whose religious history it documents. Joseph Smith, whom most Latter Day Saints believe to have translated the work, stated, "I told the brethren that the Book of Mormon was the most correct of any book on earth, and the keystone of our religion, and a man would get nearer to God by abiding by its precepts, than by any other book." Unresolved issues of the book's historicity and the lack of supporting archaeological evidence have led some adherents to adopt the position that the Book of Mormon may have been the creation of Smith, but that it was nevertheless divinely inspired. Between these two views is the view held by some Latter Day Saints that the Book of Mormon is a divine work of a spiritual nature, written in ancient America, but that its purpose is to teach of Christ and not to be used as a guide for history, geology, archaeology, or anthropology.

Archaeology

Discussion regarding the historicity of the Book of Mormon often focuses on archaeological issues, some of which relate to the large size and the long time span of the civilizations mentioned in the book. A contemporary Mormon view is that these civilizations rose and fell in Mesoamerica. Civilizations of their magnitude and duration would be expected to leave extensive archaeological records. Several Mesoamerican civilizations did exist in the time period covered by the Book of Mormon, including the Olmec, Zapotec and Maya. The Olmec and Zapotec civilizations developed a writing system that may have served as the model for the later Mayan writing system, which became highly developed. The Maya developed a complex calendar and were advanced in astronomy and mathematics.

The Book of Mormon mentions several animals, plants, and technologies which are unattested in pre-Columbian America, the period relevant to the Book of Mormon. These include asses, cattle, horses, oxen, sheep, swine, goats, elephants, wheat, barley, silk, steel, brass, breast plates, chains, iron working, plows, swords, scimitars, and chariots. The Smithsonian Institution has stated that "none of the principal food plants and domestic animals of the Old World (except the dog) were present in the New World before Columbus."

Adherents of the Latter Day Saint movement give varied responses to these criticisms. Some point to what they say is evidence for the presence of these items and locations. Others invoke the limited geography model, regarding the events of the Book of Mormon as taking place in such a geographically limited area that no evidence should be expected. Some counter that the words used in the Book of Mormon refer not to the animals, plants and technologies that presently exist but to other similar items that did exist at the time. These views are not directly supported by the LDS Church, but they do motivate archaeological efforts to further understand these situations, including research being performed by Brigham Young University (BYU) professors.

LDS-funded archaeology
In 1955, Thomas Stuart Ferguson, an attorney and a Latter Day Saint and the founder of the New World Archaeological Foundation (NWAF), with five years of funding from the Church of Jesus Christ of Latter-day Saints (LDS Church), began to dig throughout Mesoamerica for evidence of the veracity of the Book of Mormon claims. In a 1961 newsletter, Ferguson predicted that although nothing had been found, the Book of Mormon cities would be found within ten years. In 1972, Christian scholar Hal Hougey wrote to Ferguson questioning the progress made, given the stated timetable in which the cities would be found. Replying to Hougey as well as secular and non-secular requests, Ferguson wrote in a letter dated June 5, 1972: "Ten years have passed . ... I had sincerely hoped that Book-of-Mormon cities would be positively identified within 10 years—and time has proved me wrong in my anticipation."

In 1969 NWAF colleague Dee Green stated "Just how much the foundation is doing to advance the cause of Book of Mormon archaeology depends on one's point of view about Book of Mormon archaeology." After this article and another six years of fruitless search, Ferguson published a paper in which he concluded, "I'm afraid that up to this point, I must agree with Dee Green, who has told us that to date there is no Book-of-Mormon geography". Referring to his own paper, Ferguson wrote a 1976 letter in which he stated: "The real implication of the paper is that you can't set the Book-of-Mormon geography down anywhere—because it is fictional and will never meet the requirements of the dirt-archeology. I should say—what is in the ground will never conform to what is in the book."

The archaeological investigations of NWAF-sponsored projects have contributed towards the documentation and understanding of pre-Columbian societies, particularly in Mesoamerica. Currently, BYU maintains 86 documents on the work of the NWAF at the BYU NWAF website and these documents are used outside both BYU and the LDS Church by researchers.

Linguistics

An additional criticism of the historical authenticity of the Book of Mormon concerns linguistics. According to the text, the Nephites and the Lamanites initially spoke Hebrew (600 BC) and might have spoken a modified Semitic language until at least 400 AD, when the Book of Mormon ends. The non-canonized introductory paragraph to the LDS Church 1981 edition of the Book of Mormon stated that the Lamanites were the "principal ancestors of the American Indians". No Semitic language is spoken natively in the Americas today, however, and there is no evidence that any Native American language has been influenced by any Semitic language at any point in its history. Historical linguists who specialize in the languages of Native America are in agreement that the languages of Native America cannot be proven to be related to each other within the last eight to ten thousand years, let alone within the last thousand. A common counterargument is that the Book of Mormon mentions contact with other civilizations that might have had their own non-Semitic languages that influenced or supplanted any Semitic language being spoken. Apologists point out that the introduction merely stated that the peoples mentioned in the Book of Mormon are the primary ancestors of the Native Americans; it did not claim that they are the sole ancestors.

The original 1830 edition of the Book of Mormon did not make this claim. The 1981 edition of the Book of Mormon states that the Lamanites are "the principal ancestors of American Indians". In 2007, the introduction to the Book of Mormon was changed to state that the Lamanites are "among the ancestors of the American Indians".

Anthon Transcript

The "Anthon Transcript" is a small piece of paper on which Joseph Smith wrote several lines of characters. According to Smith, these characters were from the golden plates (the ancient record from which Smith claims to have translated the Book of Mormon) and represent the reformed Egyptian writing that was on the plates. This paper was then delivered to professor Charles Anthon, a well-known classical scholar of Columbia College, for an expert opinion on the authenticity of the characters and the translation. Adherents to the Book of Mormon claim that Anthon attested to the characters' authenticity in writing to Martin Harris but then ripped up his certification after hearing the story of Smith and the plates. Critics, and Anthon himself, claim that Anthon believed any idea of reformed Egyptian was a hoax all along and that Harris was being duped. Anthon's own accounts differ, however: in his first he states that he refused to give his opinion at all; in the second he declares that he gave his opinion "without any hesitation" with intent to expose the transcript as a fraud.

Population genetics

The Book of Mormon tells of the people of Jared, consisting of several families from the Tower of Babel, who migrated to America from the Old World before Abraham's time; a group including Lehi's family who migrated to America from Jerusalem around 600 BC; and another group (the people of Mulek) who migrated to America from Jerusalem about eight years later. Although the Book of Mormon makes no overt assertions regarding the migration or non-migration of other groups to America, an introductory paragraph added to the 1981 edition identifies the Lamanites as the "principal ancestors of the American Indians". In 2007, this statement was changed to "among the ancestors".

North American Indians are generally considered the genetic descendants of East Eurasian peoples. Several authors have published works that suggest that current studies of genetic anthropology using DNA evidence do not provide support for the Book of Mormon. To date there are no DNA studies that link any Native American group with West Eurasia. Some Mormon researchers claim that it is not valid to use genetics to attempt to prove or disprove the historicity of the Book of Mormon, citing a lack of source genes and the improbability of tracing Israelite DNA even if present.

Smithsonian Institution statement on the Book of Mormon
The Smithsonian Institution issues a standard reply to requests for their opinion regarding the Book of Mormon as an archaeological or scientific guide. Prior to 1998, the statement denied any evidence for pre-Columbian contact between Old and New Worlds: "Certainly there was no contact with the ancient Egyptians, Hebrews or other peoples of Western Asia or the Near East." In 1998, the Smithsonian began issuing a shorter letter without the detailed response found in the first letter, and limited its comment to briefly deny any use of the Book of Mormon as an archaeological guide by the institution.

Limited geography model

Since the time of its publication, most Latter Day Saints have viewed and explained the Book of Mormon as a comprehensive history of all Native Americans; this understanding of the Book of Mormon is referred to as the "hemispheric model." Other Latter Day Saints, however, believe that the hemispheric model is an assumption not supported by a close reading of the text. B. H. Roberts states the inadequacy of the hemispheric model in Studies of the Book of Mormon:

[C]ould the people of Mulek and of Lehi ... part of the time numbering and occupying the land at least from Yucatan to Cumorah ... live and move and have their being in the land of America and not come in contact with other races and tribes of men, if such existed in the New World within Book of Mormon times? To make this seem possible the area occupied by the Nephites and Lamanites would have to be extremely limited, much more limited, I fear, than the Book of Mormon would admit our assuming.

The cities mentioned in the Book of Mormon have not been identified. This approach, often referred to as the "Limited Geography Model", argues for a more limited view of the Book of Mormon, suggesting that the book is a history of only a small group of Native Americans in Central America. This theory has been gaining substantial support among LDS scholars since the mid-1980s because it more accurately represents the descriptions given within the text itself. For instance, the populations and civilizations described in the Book of Mormon were likely too small (only a few million) to fill entire continents; moreover, there is much evidence that one common assumption of the past—that Book of Mormon civilizations were alone in America—is probably incorrect. Most LDS authors hold the belief that the Book of Mormon events took place within a limited region in Mesoamerica, and that others were present on the continent at the time of Lehi's arrival. This geographical and population model was formally published in an official church magazine, Ensign, in a two-part series by John L. Sorenson published in September and October 1984. This was followed by a book on the subject by Sorenson in 1985.

Other defenses of historicity 
The Gospel Topics essays section of the LDS official website hosts two essays titled "Book of Mormon and DNA Studies" and "Book of Mormon Translation". These are some of the few official Church statements with regard to such historical issues.

See also
Reformed Egyptian
Anachronisms in the Book of Mormon
Origin of the Book of Mormon
Heartland Model
Proposed Book of Mormon geographical setting

Notes

References

.
.
.
.
.
.
.
.
.
.
.
.
. 
.
. 
.
.
.
.
.
.
.
.
.
.
.
.
.
.
.
.

External links
Dallin H. Oaks on the Historicity of the Book of Mormon
FairMormon specializes in Mormon apologetics. It has no official connection to the church. 

Book of Mormon studies
Criticism of Mormonism
Pre-Columbian trans-oceanic contact
Textual criticism
Authorship debates
Mormon

Pseudohistory